Chao Ong Kham (died 1769 in Chiang Mai), also known as Ong Nok, was the king of Luang Phrabang from 1713 to 1723, later the king of Lanna from 1727 to 1769.

Ong Kham was a son of Indra Kumara, who was the king of Chiang Hung (Sipsong Panna) and also grandson of Sourigna Vongsa.

Ong Kham was a cousin and also a son-in-law of Kingkitsarat. He seized the Luang Phrabang throne after Kingkitsarat in 1713. Ten years later, he was deposed by Inthasom when he was away on a hunting trip. Ong Kham joint the monkhold for several years. After Thepsin assassinated the local Burmese governor, Ong Kham was offered the throne of Lanna in 1727. He ruled until his death in 1769.

References

Kings of Luang Phrabang
Rulers of Chiang Mai
1769 deaths
18th-century Laotian people
18th-century Thai monarchs